Chernivtsi is an urban settlement (town) in Vinnytsia Oblast (province), located in the historic region of Podolia. It was formerly the administrative center of Chernivtsi Raion, and is now administrated under Mohyliv-Podilskyi Raion. Population:

History 
Until the Partitions of Poland Czerniejowce (or Czernijowce) was a private town of Poland, located in the Lesser Poland Province of the Polish Crown, owned by the houses of Koniecpolski and Lubomirski.

References

External links
 Chernivtsi at the Verkhovna Rada website
 Chernivtsi at the Informational portal "Vinnytsia Oblast as part of the Ukrainian SSR"

Urban-type settlements in Mohyliv-Podilskyi Raion
Yampolsky Uyezd